Thamnocalamus is a genus of clumping bamboo in the grass family. These species are found from the Himalayas as well as Madagascar and Southern Africa.

Thamnocalamus is closely related to Fargesia. The two genera are sometimes regarded as a single genus by some authors.

Species
 Thamnocalamus chigar (Stapleton) Stapleton - Nepal
 Thamnocalamus spathiflorus (Trin.) Munro - Tibet, Bhutan, India, Nepal
 Thamnocalamus tessellatus (Nees) Soderstr. & R.P.Ellis - Madagascar, KwaZulu-Natal, Free State, Lesotho, Cape Province
 Thamnocalamus unispiculatus T.P.Yi & J.Y.Shi - Tibet

formerly included
see Chimonobambusa Drepanostachyum Fargesia Himalayacalamus Neomicrocalamus Pleioblastus Pseudosasa

References

Bambusoideae
Bambusoideae genera